Debjit Majumder (born 6 March 1988), is an Indian professional footballer who plays as a goalkeeper for Indian Super League club Chennaiyin.

Early life
Majumder hails from Hindmotor, known for Hindustan Motors factory(now closed), in Hooghly district.

Playing career

Early years
Majumder spent early years at Uttarpara Netaji Brigade team under coach Anup Nag. He started his career at Calcutta Football League (CFL) with Food Corporation of India FC (FCI) football team. He went on to play for teams like United Sikkim and Kalighat MS.

East Bengal
Majumder joined East Bengal for 2011–12 season and made 4 appearances.

Bhawanipore
Majumder played for I-League 2nd Division team, Bhawanipore F.C. for two seasons and the team came close to promotion during 2014 season.

Mohun Bagan
Majumder was signed as replacement keeper by Mohun Bagan in 2014, as Shilton Paul was loaned to Chennaiyin FC. Majumder was awarded man of the match for his performance against East Bengal on 28 March 2015 in Kolkata derby.
As a result of his stellar performances during the current season, he was selected the Best Goalkeeper of I-League 2015. In 2015-16 I-League season, Majumder used as the number 1 goalkeeper and also played AFC Champions League Qualifier game against Tampines Rovers FC & Shandong Luneng Taishan. He was also awarded the FPAI Fans Player of the Year award in the 2015-16 season.

Mumbai City (loan)
In July 2015 Majumder was drafted to play for Mumbai City FC in the 2015 Indian Super League.

Atlético de Kolkata (loan)
On 4 July 2016, Atlético de Kolkata confirmed that Debjit has signed on the dotted lines on loan from Mohun Bagan for third season of Hero ISL.

ATK
In July 2017, ATK has retained AIFF Goalkeeper of the year Debjit Majumder for 3 years.

East Bengal 
In 2020, Debjit Majumder has signed for his former club East Bengal and will play in the 2020-'21 Hero Indian Super League.

Chennaiyin
He was signed by Chennaiyin in 2021-22 ISL.

Career statistics

Club

Honours
Bhawanipore
 Bordoloi Trophy: 2013
Mohun Bagan
 I-League: 2014–15, 2019–20
 Federation Cup: 2015–16

Atletico de Kolkata
Indian Super League: 2016

Individual
Bordoloi Trophy player of the tournament: 2013
Best goalkeeper of I-League: 2014–15
Best goalkeeper of I-League: 2016–17

References

External links 

 Soccerway profile

 Indian Super League profile

Indian footballers
I-League 2nd Division players
I-League players
Mohun Bagan AC players
Mumbai City FC players
ATK (football club) players
People from Hooghly district
Footballers from West Bengal
Association football goalkeepers
1988 births
Living people
East Bengal Club players
Bhawanipore FC players
Indian Super League players